Cocheras may refer to:

 Cocheras (Madrid Metro)
 Cocheras (Seville Metro)